Nils Henrik Måsø (23 September 1952 – 9 January 2022) was a Norwegian politician, journalist and editor. 

Måsø was a journalist for the Sami newspaper Ságat, starting as freelance journalist from 1979, a part time assignment from 1983, and appointed as district leader for Ságat in Tana from 1989. From 2001 he was chief editor of the Sami newspaper Min Áigi. He was a politician for the Centre Party, a leader of the Finnmark chapter of the party. He served as deputy mayor of Tana, and was elected member of the Sámi Parliament of Norway and of the Finnmark county council. Måsø died on 9 January 2022.

References

1952 births
2022 deaths
People from Tana, Norway
Norwegian journalists
Norwegian newspaper editors
Centre Party (Norway) politicians
Finnmark politicians
Sámi politicians
Members of the Sámi Parliament of Norway